Pleocoma conjungens, the Santa Cruz rain beetle, is a species of rain beetle in the family Pleocomidae. It is found in North America.

Subspecies
These two subspecies belong to the species Pleocoma conjungens:
 Pleocoma conjungens conjungens Horn, 1888 (Santa Cruz rain beetle)
 Pleocoma conjungens lucia Linsley, 1941

References

Further reading

 
 

scarabaeiformia
Articles created by Qbugbot
Beetles described in 1888